Accidental Meeting is a 1994 American made-for-television thriller film directed by Michael Zinberg, and starring Linda Gray and Linda Purl. The film was promoted as 'the female version of Strangers on a Train (1951)'.

Plot 
Jennifer's husband is committing adultery. Maryanne's boss treats her like dirt. After an accidental meeting, the women decide to kill each other's men. Jennifer goes through with the deal, but Maryanne backs out. Jennifer, enraged, will not rest until Maryanne lives up to her part of the deal.

Cast
Linda Gray as Jennifer Parris
Linda Purl as Maryanne Bellmann
Leigh McCloskey as Richard
Ernie Lively as Obrenski
David Hayward as Jonathan Holtman
Kent McCord as Jack Parris
Lorna Scott as Lynn
Nancy Hochman as Julie
Bethany Richards as Zoe
Steve Tom as Hallman
Duke Stroud as Palmer

References

External links

1994 television films
1994 films
1994 thriller films
American thriller television films
USA Network original films
Films scored by Patrick Williams
1990s American films